Parola is a town in the municipality of Hattula in Finland.

Parola is Filipino for "Lighthouse"

Parola may also refer to:
Andrea Parola (born 1979), an Italian football midfielder  
Carlo Parola (1921–2000), an Italian football player and coach
La parola che uccide, a 1914 Italian film 
Parola Tank Museum
Parola, the seat of Finnish municipality of Hattula
Parola, Maharashtra, a city in the Indian state of Maharashtra
Parola island in the South China Sea (aka Northeast Cay)
Parola di ladro (Honour Among Thieves), a 1957 Italian comedy film
Parola-class patrol vessel, a class of patrol boats in the Philippine Coast Guard